Mario Santillán Hernández (born April 22, 1981) is a Paralympic athlete from Mexico competing mainly in category T46 long-distance events. He is missing his right hand.

He competed in the 2008 Summer Paralympics in Beijing, China.  There he won a gold medal in the men's Marathon - T46 event in world record time. He also won a bronze medal in the men's 5000 metres - T46 event.

As of January 2013, his T46 marathon world record, set in Beijing, remains unbeaten.

Notes

References

External links
 

1981 births
Living people
Paralympic athletes of Mexico
Athletes (track and field) at the 2008 Summer Paralympics
Athletes (track and field) at the 2012 Summer Paralympics
Paralympic gold medalists for Mexico
Paralympic bronze medalists for Mexico
Mexican male long-distance runners
World record holders in Paralympic athletics
Medalists at the 2008 Summer Paralympics
Paralympic medalists in athletics (track and field)
Medalists at the 2007 Parapan American Games
Medalists at the 2011 Parapan American Games
21st-century Mexican people